Gérard Audran (or Girard Audran) (2 August 164026 July 1703), was a French engraver of the Audran family, the third son of Claude Audran.

Life

He was born in Lyon and was taught the first principles of design and engraving by his father.  Following the example of his brother, he went to Paris to perfect himself in his art. 
In 1666, he engraved for Le Brun Constantines Battle with Laxentius, his Triumph, and the Stoning of Stephen, which gave great satisfaction to the painter, and placed Audran in the very first rank of engravers at Paris. 
The next year he set out for Rome, where he resided three years, and engraved several fine plates. He is reputed to have worked for or trained with Carlo Maratta.

That great patron of the arts, J. B. Colbert, was so struck with Audran's works that he persuaded Louis XIV to recall him to Paris. On his return, Audran applied himself assiduously to engraving, and was appointed engraver to the king, from whom he received great encouragement. 
In the year 1681 he was admitted to the council of the Royal Academy.  He died in Paris.

His engravings of Le Bruns Battles of Alexander are regarded as the best of his numerous works. Gerard published in 1683 a work entitled Les Proportions du corps humain mesurés sur les plus belles figures de l'antiquité.

References

Attribution:

Further reading
 Gérard Audran, Les proportions du corps humain : mesurées sur les plus belles figures de l'Antiquité, 1683
 "Audran (Gérard ou Girard)", In: Bénézit, t. ABF. - DBF., 1976 and 1999
 Roger-Armand Weigert, Estampes, Inventaire du fonds français, graveurs du XVIIe siècle, 1939, t. I (Alix - Boudeau), pp 124–149

External links

1640 births
1703 deaths
16th-century French engravers
17th-century French engravers
Engravers from Lyon
Baroque engravers
Pupils of Carlo Maratta